The Spanish pavilion houses Spain's national representation during the Venice Biennale arts festivals.

Background

Organization and building 

The pavilion was designed and built by Francisco Javier de Luque between 1921 and 1922. While its façade shows influence of 17th century Spanish Baroque architecture, its internal layout is similar to that of the German Pavilion, for a kind of uniformity in the early Giardini buildings. The painter-architect Joaquín Vaquero Palacios restored the pavilion in 1952 and made its façade more modern, with a continuous brick face.

Representation by year

Art 

 1954 — Miguel Ortiz Berrocal
 1958 — Eduardo Chillida
 1970 — Gaston Orellana
 1984 — Antoni Clavé
 1988 — Jorge Oteiza, Susana Solano 
 1990 — Antoni Miralda
 1993 — Antoni Tàpies
 1999 — Manolo Valdés, Esther Ferrer (Curator: David Pérez)
 2001 — Ana Laura Aláez, Javier Pérez (Curator: Estrella de Diego)
 2003 — Santiago Sierra (Curator: Rosa Martínez)
 2005 — Antoni Muntadas (Curator: Bartomeu Marí)
 2007 — Manuel Vilariño, José Luis Guerín, "Los Torreznos", Rubén Ramos (Curator: Alberto Ruiz de Samaniego)
 2009 — Miquel Barceló (Curator: Enrique Juncosa)
 2011 — Dora García (Curator: Katya García-Antón)
 2013 — Lara Almarcegui (Curator: Octavio Zaya)
 2015 — Francesc Ruiz, Pepo Salazar, Cabello/Carceller + Salvador Dalí (Curator: Martí Manen)
 2017 — Jordi Colomer (Curator: Manuel Segade)  
 2019 — Itziar Okariz, Sergio Prego (Curator: Peio Aguirre)
 2022 — Ignasi Aballí (Curator: Beatriz Espejo)

References

Bibliography

Further reading 

 
 

National pavilions
Spanish art